Edward John Foster (born 21 January 1985 in Banbury, Oxfordshire) is an English cricketer.  Foster is a dashing left-handed opening batsman and wicket-keeper.  Appearing for Shropshire in Minor counties cricket,  Foster has also played first-class for Loughborough UCCE team which recorded a shock eight-wicket victory over Worcestershire. He had a fine match, scoring 83 in the first innings, as he put on 197 for the first wicket with Richard Clinton, then following up with 22 not out in the second.

His father, John, played List A and Minor counties cricket for Shropshire.

References

External links
 
 Statistical summary from CricketArchive

English cricketers
Loughborough MCCU cricketers
Living people
1985 births
Sportspeople from Banbury
Alumni of Loughborough University
Shropshire cricketers
Wicket-keepers